Hibbertia horricomis is a species of flowering plant in the family Dilleniaceae and is endemic to the a restricted area of New South Wales. It is a small, erect to spreading shrub with hairy foliage, linear to elliptic leaves, and yellow flowers with about twenty stamens arranged around the two hairy carpels.

Description 
The flowers are arranged singly on the ends of the branchlets and are sessile. There are twenty to twenty-four stamens arranged around two hairy carpels, each carpel with four ovules.

Taxonomy 
Hibbertia horricomis was first formally described in 2013 by Hellmut R. Toelken in the Journal of the Adelaide Botanic Gardens from specimens collected in Deua National Park in 1984. The specific epithet (horricomis) means "bristly", referring to the stiff spreading hairs on the leaves and branches.

Distribution and habitat 
This hibbertia grows in open forest on ridges and steep slopes in Deua National Park on the Southern Tablelands of New South Wales.

See also 
 List of Hibbertia species

References 

horricomis
Flora of New South Wales
Plants described in 2013
Taxa named by Hellmut R. Toelken